Jean-Marc Reiser (13 April 1941 – 5 November 1983) was a French comics creator.

Biography

A prolific cartoon artist from 1959 until his death, Reiser made his debut in the publication La Gazette de Nectar for the Nicolas winery. His works are to this day controversial, with some people enthusiastically endorsing them, and others loathing them. At a 2004 exhibition of his works in the Centre Pompidou, the entrance displayed the warning "Beware! Some of the exhibited pictures could hurt the feelings of several visitors."

He founded the Franco-Belgian comics magazine Hara-Kiri in 1960 together with Fred and François Cavanna. Reiser was known to attack taboos of all kinds.  Hara-Kiri was banned in 1970 by the French Minister of the Interior for mocking the just deceased Charles de Gaulle. Reiser subsequently published his drawings in the follow-up magazine Charlie Hebdo and several other publications. In 1978 he won the Grand Prix de la ville d'Angoulême. He died on 5 November 1983, in Paris, of bone cancer.

Awards
 1974 Prix Saint-Michel, for La vie au grand air
 1978 Angoulême Festival, Grand Prix de la ville

Selected bibliography
 Ils sont moches (Éditions du square, 1970)
 Mon Papa (Éditions du square, 1971)
 Je vous aime (Euréditions, 1971)
 La vie au grand air (Éditions du square, 1972)
 La vie des bêtes
 On vit une époque formidable
 Vive les femmes 
 Vive les vacances
 Phantasmes
 Les copines
 Gros Dégueulasse (Reiser et Éditions Albin Michel, 1982)
 Fous d'amour

Notes

Sources

 Reiser publications in Pilote, Charlie Mensuel, BD, L'Écho des savanes BDoubliées 
 Reiser albums Bedetheque

External links

 Jean-Marc Reiser biography on Lambiek Comiclopedia

1941 births
1983 deaths
People from Meurthe-et-Moselle
French comics artists
French cartoonists
French editorial cartoonists
French satirists
Charlie Hebdo people
Burials at Montparnasse Cemetery
Grand Prix de la ville d'Angoulême winners
Deaths from cancer in France